Jacob Stanczak, known professionally as Kill the Noise, is an American DJ and record producer from Rochester, New York. His collaboration with Skrillex, Fatman Scoop and Michael Angelakos, "Recess", entered the UK Singles Chart at number 57. The song is the title track from Skrillex's debut album Recess. He has performed at Coachella, Electric Daisy Carnival (EDC), Lollapalooza, Ultra Music Festival, Creamfields, Spring Awakening Music Festival, Holy Ship, Electric Zoo, Electric Forest, Bonnaroo and Tomorrowland.

Career
In 2006, Stanczak recorded a DJ mix for the Barcode Recordings compilation album Shades of Black that was featured on its CD release.

2011

In 2011, Kill the Noise produced and was featured on "Narcissistic Cannibal", and "Fuels the Comedy" from Korn's tenth studio album, The Path of Totality. "Narcissistic Cannibal" was released as a single on October 18, 2011, with the album following on December 6, 2011. On February 3, 2012, Stanczak took the stage with Korn to perform on Jimmy Kimmel Live!.

2012

Kill the Noise was chosen as MTV Clubland's “Video Pick of the Year” for his song “Kill the Noise (Part I)” which was released off his 2011 Kill Kill Kill EP which was released through OWSLA.

2013

In 2013 Kill the Noise was chosen a second time for MTV Clubland's “Pick of the Year” for his song “Black Magic (Kill the Noise Pt II)” which was released off his 2012  BLVCK MVGIC EP. That same year he embarked on his headlining North American tour called “The Black Magic Mystical Wonder Tour”.

2014

Kill the Noise began working on multiple major film soundtracks, including the Teenage Mutant Ninja Turtles (2014) with the platinum-certified track “Shell Shocked” with Juicy J, Wiz Khalifa, Ty Dolla $ign and composer Brian Tyler. In October 2014 Kill the Noise and Feed Me released their single “Far Away” which was accompanied by a music video animated by Augenblick Studios which is known for their work on the Adult Swim show Super Jail.

In 2014, Kill the Noise teamed up with AnjunaBeat artist Mat Zo to release the track Kill the Zo, Pt. It was accompanied with a tour of the same name.

2015

In 2015 Kill the Noise released his first full-length album OCCULT CLASSIC through OWSLA. The album featured AWOLNATION, Dillon Francis, Tommy Trash and Madsonik. The release of this album was followed with his headlining tour called “Occult Classic Tour” which traveled throughout North America.

2016

In April 2016 Kill the Noise released the music video for his single “I Do Coke” with Feed Me off of his album OCCULT CLASSIC. Occult Classic was later followed up by a 17-track remix album titled Alt Classic (stylised as ALT CLASSIC) released on 13 May 2016 - featuring notable artists REZZ, NGHTMRE, Snails, Gammer & Slander. The video starred Tom Sandoval from the hit Bravo show Vanderpump Rules. In 2016 he produced a remake of the classic “Relax” by Frankie Goes to Hollywood with A$AP Rocky, Nitty Scott, and Sam Sparro for Zoolander 2. Kill The Noise notably performed at Fuji Rock Festival on July 23, 2016.

2017

In 2017, Kill the Noise wrote “Divebomb” which featured Tom Morello for the box office hit XXX: Return of Xander Cage (2017). In the fall Kill the Noise joined Seven Lions and Tritonal on the Horizon Tour which traveled across North America between October through December. Kill The Noise also teamed with Seven Lions to release the single “Cold Hearted” on Monstercat Records.

2018

Kill The Noise teamed with Tritonal, and Seven Lions to release the collaborative song “Horizon”, which was written on their 2017 North America tour. Kill The Noise also notably performed as the bassrush stage headliner at Electric Daisy Carnival with 12th Planet on May 20, 2018.

2019

In 2019 Kill the Noise wrote and produced the song “Redemption” which featured Al Jourgensen for the Netflix Original Film In the Shadow of the Moon (2019 film).

Discography

Studio albums
 Occult Classic (2015)
 EMBRACƎ (2022)

References

External links
 

21st-century American musicians
American DJs
American house musicians
American people of Polish descent
Record producers from New York (state)
Dubstep musicians
Electro house musicians
Living people
Musicians from Rochester, New York
Year of birth missing (living people)
Owsla artists
Electronic dance music DJs